Pseudojana is a genus of moths in the family Eupterotidae.

Species
 Pseudojana clemensi Schultze, 1910
 Pseudojana incandescens Walker, 1855
 Pseudojana obscura Holloway, 1987
 Pseudojana pallidipennis Hampson, 1895
 Pseudojana perspicuifascia Rothschild, 1917
 Pseudojana roepkei Nieuwenhuis., 1948
 Pseudojana vitalisi Candèze, 1927

References

Eupterotinae